"Emily" is the second episode of the fourth series of the British teen drama Skins, and 31st overall. It first aired on 4 February 2010 on E4 in both Ireland and the United Kingdom. The episode was written by Ed Hime, and was directed by Philippa Langdale. The episode focuses on the character of Emily Fitch (Kathryn Prescott), her continuing romantic relationship with girlfriend Naomi Campbell (Lily Loveless) as well as family problems with her mother Jenna Fitch. Emily decides to investigate the suicide of Sophia Moore, the girl who killed herself in the first episode, suspecting Naomi cheated on her with Sophia.

Plot
 
The episode begins with Emily in Naomi's house, looking at her girlfriend's pictures. A package arrives containing a pair of goggles that Naomi has bought for Emily, telling her not to ever forget that she loves her. The couple uses Emily's moped and visits the Fitch house, where Rob Fitch is cleaning out the garage. Emily talks to her mother, Jenna Fitch who insist they have a conversation about Emily's future. Emily brushes her off, and rides off to Roundview college with Naomi.

The police turn up and they are both called in to be interviewed. Their names were listed by the family as close friends of Sophia's, even though they'd never met her. Emily learns that Naomi was dealing powder with Cook the night of the suicide and sold some to Sophia to pay for the motorbike goggles she bought her. Effy returns to college and lets Freddie know he's the one she's been thinking about all summer.

Behind Naomi's back, Emily visits Sophia's family to find out more about the dead girl. She discovers that the Sophia claimed to be best friends with Naomi and Emily. While looking around Sophia's bedroom Emily discovers that Sophia was gay and she finds and takes a wooden box and a university prospectus with a key inside. She leaves and later, when flicking through the prospectus, she finds a photo of Sophia laughing with Naomi. She realises that Naomi did in fact know the dead girl and suspects that she might have cheated on her with Sophia.

Emily interrupts Naomi's class by slamming a picture of Sophia and Naomi taken at the University Open Day, making the latter walk out of class. The two argue about lying and Naomi admits that she indeed met Sophia at a University open day which she was attending behind Emily's back. She insists they just talked and that nothing had happened between them. Still a bit doubtful, Emily tells her about they key she found and Naomi believes it is for Sophia's locker at the army base. They go to the army base and open it and inside they find a shrine to Naomi. They discover that Sophia was infatuated with Naomi and Emily makes up with her, having sex with Naomi in an army storage closet.

Later, Emily has a falling out with her mother and decides to move out. Katie begs her to stay but Emily still leaves. Emily moves in with Naomi and they seem to have put everything behind them. However, when they go to a party later on, Emily becomes suspicious again when Naomi starts talking to other girls. Cook sees Effy and Freddie kissing at the party and takes his anger out on a fellow party-goer and ends up headbutting JJ also.

At dawn, Emily takes Sophia's wooden box and goes back to the club where Sophia died to meet Sophia's brother, Matt, to open up the box. Emily believes the box contains evidence that proves Naomi's affair with Sophia. Soon after Matt arrives, Naomi turns up and asks Emily to forget all about Sophia and Emily tells her that she can't leave it. Matt runs to the roof and Emily follows him. Up on the roof they open the box and find Sophia's sketchbook. Through Sophia's drawings that depict her one-day affair with Naomi, Emily finds out that Naomi did in fact cheat on her. A distraught Emily leaves the roof with Naomi crying and calling after her.

Emily returns home and tearfully tells her father that Naomi had cheated on her. As he consoles her, Rob tells her that he once cheated on Jenna, and that she should not worry as it gets better after its worse. Emily goes back to Naomi's house, reading a note on the front door saying, "I'll do anything". The episode ends with Emily walking through the front door, seemingly following her father's advice.

Production
Lily Loveless and Kathryn Prescott have hinted in interviews that series 4 was about their characters "being a fully fledged couple" with Loveless saying the previous series was just "the chase". Prescott said that viewers were left with the impression of them "living happily ever after" but this series had Naomi "clearly messing around in that happy summer". After reading the script, Loveless felt "very sad that Naomi cheated". Prescott commented that she "thought Naomi was a bitch" for cheating, pointing out costar Loveless would agree as well. Loveless commented that she thought Naomi "cheated as a way of escapism" as she was not the kind of person who has relationships.

Director Philippa Langdale told Loveless and Prescott to not look into the locker containing Sophia's shrine to Naomi before filming as to get the full effect of being "properly weirded out" on the first take. When the locker opened on the first take, Loveless wanted to laugh "because it was so mental."

Ed Hime, who wrote the episode, commented that during the airing of series 3, he wanted "to write for Emily.....and then watched Naomily become a bona-fide phenomenon". He "thought of all the assembled Naomily fans, who had invested so much love and hope in them [and] felt a paralysing mixture of fear, duty, and a desperate need to impress." As such, Ed Hime "wanted to write about the dark side of Naomily" and "what happens after you've got the girl and walked off into the sunset?" He cast Emily as "the intrepid detective", citing Emily's traits - "her purity, intelligence, bravery and tenacity" are "traits that make a great private eye."

This episode used an illustrator to tell the story of Naomi's affair through Sophia's sketchbook. Company Pictures hired Lydia Starkey, who commented she "stylised [her] visual language to suit Sophia's character and emotional situation."

Reception
According to early reports, "Emily" drew 962,000 viewers, maintaining strong ratings from the previous week. The Broadcasters' Audience Research Board reported that "Emily" was E4's 2nd most watched show of the week with 1,025,000 viewers.

References

External links
 "Emily" at IMDb

2010 British television episodes
Skins (British TV series) episodes